Gerald Potterton  (8 March 1931 – 23 August 2022) was a Canadian director, animator, producer and writer. He is best known for directing the cult classic Heavy Metal and for his animation work on Yellow Submarine.

Potterton won one Peabody Award and was nominated three times for an Academy Award for Best Animated Short Film: as director on the National Film Board of Canada animated shorts My Financial Career and Christmas Cracker, and as producer for The Selfish Giant.

Early life
Potterton was born and raised in south London's Tooting Bec neighbourhood, the eldest of three children born into an entertainment-industry family—his father was a professional musician and his uncle was the manager of the London Palladium.  By age five, he was attending the Saturday morning pictures, where he first became interested in film; by 14, he was getting regular work as a child actor in live-action films being shot at Ealing Studios, Elstree Studios and Pinewood Studios. He won a place to study art at the Hammersmith Academy; upon graduation, in 1949, he was drafted to fight in the Korean War. He spent two years in the Royal Air Force; after his discharge, a neighbour suggested that he apply at Halas and Batchelor, the studio which was doing the animation work for the film Animal Farm, which would be Britain's first animated feature. By this time, Potterton had an excellent art portfolio, including a comic book; he was hired and spent the next two years there as an assistant animator.

During this time, Potterton also founded the Grasshopper Group, a cooperative with the mission to help London's animators produce their projects. He met Norman McLaren, the Scottish animator who was already on his way to becoming the star filmmaker at the National Film Board of Canada (NFB). Potterton also wanted to leave London, which had become intolerably dirty—the 1952 Great Smog of London, which killed at least 4,000 people, had a deep impact on him. That, and McLaren's description of Canada and working at the NFB, led him to move to Ottawa in 1954. He was hired by the NFB; his first project was the 1955 animated training film Huff and Puff.

Career
Between 1954 and 1960, Potterton worked on 10 films. In 1960, he was offered a job as a filmmaker at Lars Calonius Productions, one of the largest TV and commercial animation films in the USA. Potterton left the NFB, moved to New York and worked at the firm for one year; he disliked living in New York and returned to the NFB, which had moved its offices to Montreal. The next seven years would be extremely fruitful for Potterton; his 1962 short film My Financial Career would be nominated for an Oscar, as would his next film, 1963's Christmas Cracker. He was then assigned to film a comedic travelogue of Canada, in which Buster Keaton rides 4,000 miles in a Railroad speeder. The result was The Railrodder, which won multiple awards and remains a popular film.

In 1967, Potterton's NFB colleague George Dunning asked him to work on his film Yellow Submarine, then being produced to feature The Beatles. While in London, Potterton had the opportunity to interview the British playwright Harold Pinter and came up with idea of a documentary about Pinter and his sketches Pinter's People. Potterton pitched the result to NBC; it aired as NBC's Experiment in Television: Pinter People. The film won several awards, including a Peabody Award.

In 1968, Potterton founded his own company, Potterton Productions. He worked with various clients, notably Reader's Digest and Cinar, to produce several children's programs. The company produced Peter Sander's The Selfish Giant and Larry Kent's Fleur Bleue in 1971; Mike Mills' The Happy Prince in 1974 and, in 1975, The Little Mermaid and The Christmas Messenger. He directed live-action and animated sequences for The Electric Company and Sesame Street; for the latter, he created the character of 'George the Farmer', who appeared in 18 episodes. He also had a large roster of ad agency clients for whom he produced commercials. By the mid-1980s, Potterton Productions was one of the largest independent production firms in Canada.

In 1981, Potterton was hired by producer Ivan Reitman to direct the animated feature Heavy Metal for Columbia Pictures. Potterton supervised all of the film's eight sequences, and the work of 65+ animators in Canada, England and the U.S. While reviews were mixed at release, Heavy Metal was the top-selling video for four consecutive weeks in the U.S. when it was released on video in 1998. It is now a cult classic.

In 1988, Potterton created and directed The Smoggies, a 53-episode animated series which aims to entertain and educate young children about environmental issues. It is still widely aired internationally.

Books
In 1977, Potterton's friend Donald Pleasence made the children's album Scouse the Mouse. Ringo Starr was one of the voices on the album and he and Pleasence decided to write a companion book of the same name. Potterton was enlisted as its illustrator. In 1968, he had produced his own comedic illustrated book, The Star (and George); he would produce two more: In the Wake of Giants: Journeys on the Barrow and the Grand Canal (2008) and The Snowman: The Story of Joseph-Armand Bombardier in 2020.

Later works
Potterton was an accomplished landscape painter. He was also a life-long aircraft buff, and created large, accurate, highly detailed paintings of planes; just before he died, he'd completed a painting of the Memphis Belle. He directed local theatre productions, and was organizing a fundraiser, using The Rainbow Boys, which was filmed in Lytton, British Columbia–he hoped to raise funds to help the town re-build after the Lytton wildfire. He continued to produce cartoons; his last project was Peter Piper and the Plane People, which was completed by Pascal Blais. When he died, he was working on a live-action comedy called A Stage Too Far.

Personal life and death
Potterton's first wife was film editor Judith Merritt; his second wife was producer Karen Marginson. He had three sons. After moving to Montreal in 1961, Potterton spent the rest of his life in Quebec; the Potterton Productions head office was his home, a farm near Cowansville, in Quebec's Eastern Townships. After suffering a stroke, he died at Cowansville's Brome-Missisquoi-Perkins Hospital on 23 August 2022, at age 91.

Filmography
Animal Farm - animated film, John Halas and Joy Batchelor 1954 - animator
Bride and Groom - short film 1955 - actor and, with John Daborn, co-director
Huff and Puff - animated training film, Graham Crabtree 1955 - co-writer, co-animator with Grant Munro
Fish Spoilage Control - animated short, David Bairstow 1956 - animator
Follow That Car - animated film 1957 - director
The Energy Picture - animated film 1957 - director
It's a Crime - animated short, Wolf Koenig 1957 - animator
Energy II - animated film 1958 - director
Hors d'oeuvre - cartoon collection 1960 - co-director
Life and Radiation - animated short, Hugh O'Connor 1960 - co-animator with Kenneth Horn & Pierre L'Amare
My Financial Career - animated short 1962 - co-animator with Grant Munro, director
Christmas Cracker - animated short 1963 - co-director with Norman McLaren, Grant Munro and Jeff Hale
The Ride - short film 1963 - actor and director
The Railrodder - short film 1965 - writer, director, co-editor with Jo Kirkpatrick
The Quiet Racket - short film, 1966 - director
Cool McCool - cartoon series 1966-1969 - co-director, with Gerald Ray, Ron Campbell and Peter Sander
Superbus - animated short film 1967 - writer, producer, director
The Trade Machine - animated film 1968 - director
Yellow Submarine - animated feature, George Dunning 1968 - animator
Pinter People - animated documentary 1969 - producer, director
Sesame Street - animated episodes: 'George the Farmer', 1969-1973 - creator and director
The Charge of the Snow Brigade - animated short 1970 - writer, producer, director 
Tiki Tiki - animated film 1971 - writer, producer, director
The Selfish Giant - animated short, Peter Sander 1971 - producer
The Electric Company - animated series 1971 - episode director
The Rainbow Boys - feature, 1973 - writer, director
The One Man Band That Went to Wall Street - animated short, Daum Crowther 1974 - producer, animator
The Happy Prince - animated short, Michael Mills 1974 - producer
The Little Mermaid - animated short, Peter Sander 1974 - producer
The Remarkable Rocket - animated film 1975 - writer, producer, director
The Christmas Messenger - animated film, Peter Sander 1975 - producer
Raggedy Ann & Andy: A Musical Adventure - animated film, Richard Williams 1977 - animator and sequence director
Canada Vignettes: Winter: Dressing Up - short film 1979 - writer and director
Canada Vignettes: Winter: Starting the Car - short film 1979 - writer and director 
Heavy Metal - animated film 1981 - director
The Awful Fate of Melpomenus Jones, animated short 1983 - director and animator
Rubik, the Amazing Cube - animated series 1983 - episode director
George and the Christmas Star - animated film 1985 - writer, animator, director
The Wonderful Wizard of Oz - animated series, Masaru Tonogawachi & Hiroshi Saitō 1986 - animator
Ghost Ship - animated film 1988 - writer, producer, director
The Smoggies - animated series 1988 - writer, director, with Colin Thibert creator 
The Real Story of I'm a Little Teapot aka The Runaway Teapot - animated film 1991 - director
The Real Story of Happy Birthday to You - animated film 1992 - writer, director
The Real Story of Baa Baa Black Sheep - animated film 1994 - director
Willy Bee - animated series 1996 - director
The Magic Orchid - animated puppet feature 1998 - co-writer and director
Albert & Atom - animated series 1999 - director
Peter Piper and the Plane People - cartoon, 2015 - co-creator

Bibliography
 The Star (and George), Harper & Row 1968.
 Scouse the Mouse, by Donald Pleasence 1977 – illustrator 
 In the Wake of Giants: Journeys on the Barrow and the Grand Canal, Ballyhay Books 2008
 L'Homme des Neiges: L’histoire de Joseph-Armand Bombardier (The Snowman: The story of Joseph-Armand Bombardier), 2020
 The Presidents' Secret – audiobook, narrator 2021

Awards
My Financial Career (1962)
 Golden Gate International Film Festival, San Francisco: First Prize, Animated Film, 1962
 American Film and Video Festival, New York: Blue Ribbon, Literature in Films, 1965
 36th Academy Awards, Los Angeles: Nominee: Best Short Subject, Cartoons, 1963

Christmas Cracker (1963)
 Golden Gate International Film Festival, San Francisco: First Prize, Best Animated Short, 1964
 Electronic, Nuclear and Teleradio Cinematographic Review, Rome: Grand Prize for Technique, Films for Children, 1965
 Electronic, Nuclear and Teleradio Cinematographic Review, Rome: Grand Prize for Animation Technique, 1965
 Film Centrum Foundation Film Show, Naarden, Netherlands: Silver Squirrel, Second Prize 1966
 Philadelphia International Festival of Short Films, Philadelphia: Award of Exceptional Merit, 1967
 Landers Associates Annual Awards, Los Angeles: Award of Merit, 1965
 37th Academy Awards, Los Angeles: Nominee: Best Short Subject – Cartoons, 1965

The Railrodder (1965)
 Festival of Tourist and Folklore Films, Brussels: Femina Award for Cinema, 1966
 18th Canadian Film Awards, Montreal: Best Travel and Recreation Film, 1966
 BFI London Film Festival, London: Outstanding Film of the Year, 1966
 Berlin International Film Festival, Berlin: Special Commendation, 1965 
 Locarno Film Festival, Locarno, Switzerland: Diploma of Honor, 1966 
 Philadelphia International Festival of Short Films, Philadelphia: Award of Exceptional Merit, 1971

Pinter People (1968)
 Peabody Award, New York: George Foster Peabody Award for Television Entertainment, 1968 
 Chicago International Film Festival, Chicago: Gold Hugo – Best of Festival 1969
 Chicago International Film Festival, Chicago: Silver Hugo – Best in Network Entertainment 1969
 Annecy International Animation Film Festival, Annecy, France: Special Jury Prize, 1969

The Selfish Giant (1971)
 44th Academy Awards, Los Angeles: Nominee: Best Animated Short Subject, 1972

Tiki Tiki (1971)
 23rd Canadian Film Awards, Toronto: Best Art Direction (Alexander Kuznetsov), 1971

The Rainbow Boys (1973)
 Atlanta Film Festival, Atlanta: Gold Medal – Best Foreign Feature, 1973

Honors
 In 1975, Potterton was inducted as a member of the Royal Canadian Academy of Arts.
 From 1970 to 1971, Potterton was vice-president of the International Animated Film Association (ASIFA, Association Internationale du Film d'Animation).
 1994 Ottawa International Animation Festival – retrospective
 1997 Seattle International Film Festival – retrospective
 1998 FIN Atlantic Film Festival, Halifax, Nova Scotia – juror
 1998 World Animation Celebration, Pasadena: Top-Ten 'Artists Who Rock'
 2000 Week with the Masters Animation Festival, Trivandrum, India – juror 
 In 2002, Potterton was invited to the Buster Keaton Celebration in Iola, Kansas, Keaton's home town. For The Railrodder, he was presented with The Buster Award, given for "professional excellence in the tradition of Buster Keaton".
 In 2008, at the 12th Annual Cartoons on the Bay International Festival of Television Animation in Salerno, Potterton was awarded the Pulcinella Lifetime Achievement Award for excellence in animation.
 2013 – Anifest, Teplice, Czechoslovakia – jury president
 2020 Toronto Animation Film Festival – retrospective
 Potterton was board vice-president, Advisor and Jury Member of the Animaze Montreal International Animation Film Festival.

See also

References

External links

 
Watch Gerald Potterton's films on the NFB website
 Gerald Potterton, Canadian Film Encyclopedia

1931 births
2022 deaths
British animators
British film producers
British television directors
British illustrators
National Film Board of Canada people
Film directors from London
British animated film directors
Canadian animated film directors
British animated film producers
Canadian animated film producers
English expatriates in Canada
People from Cowansville